Pisana Cornaro (died 10 March 1769) was a Dogaressa of Venice by marriage to the Doge Alvise Giovanni Mocenigo (r. 1763–1779).

Pisana Cornaro was the daughter of Federico Cornaro and married 5 October 1739. Upon his election as doge, the spouse demanded to reintroduce the ceremony of the Solemn Entry of the dogaressa, as well as the other ceremonies surrounding her, rituals which had been abolished during the 17th century. The 22 April 1763, dogaressa Pisana therefore celebrated her entry followed by all the traditional rituals, such as to receive the representatives from the city guilds, with the exception of the coronation. These ceremonies attracted much attention and were seen as a sign that the former grandness of Venice should return.

Pisana was described as a simple and retiring person, more interested in her household than in her role as dogaressa, who abhorred pomp and became popular for her involvement in charity. In 1766, she presided at the marriage of her son to Francesca Grimani. She was deeply affected by the early death of her daughter-in-law, and lost interest in public life. She spent much of her time at the country villa in Cordignano, where she was popular as a good employer.

In the work "On the Character, Customs, and Female Mind", the French academician Thomas described her: "Let us mention a Venetian matron who was really wise, pious, and gifted with dignity as well as excellent qualities. She was not old when she died. People will at once perceive that I am alluding to Pisana Cornaro Mocenigo, whose nobleness of character, piety, and learning were unrivalled, and besides amusing herself with astronomical observations and natural history, took a singular pleasure in the study of anatomy, in which she made such great progress that she excited the admiration of the illustrious Frotomedico Santorini, and also of the immortal Giambattista Morgagni, prince of the anatomists of our time. We have scattered these few flowers on the tomb of the late renowned Dogaressa, although her happy spirit is sufficiently requited by the tribute of tears and constant regret offered to her memory by her loving husband, H. Serene H. Alvise Mocenigo."

After her death, her spouse remarried Polissena Contarini Da Mula in 1771, though she does not seem to have played to part of dogaressa in a ceremonial sense as much as did Pisana Cornaro, though she did become the center of the literary circle her consort gathered on his private villa.

References 
 Staley, Edgcumbe:  The dogaressas of Venice : The wives of the doges, London : T. W. Laurie, 1910
 Louisa Lauw: The Dogaressa

1769 deaths
Dogaressas of Venice
Year of birth unknown
18th-century Venetian people
18th-century Venetian women